Australian rules football on the Gold Coast, Queensland can be traced back to the Gold Coast Australian Football League that was established in 1961. The city's interest in the sport has been heavily linked to the Southport Australian Football Club, the Brisbane Football Club and more recently the Gold Coast Football Club. The highest form of the sport played on the Gold Coast is the Australian Football League's team the Gold Coast Football Club, who were admitted into the competition in 2011.

History

Gold Coast Australian Football League
On 18 May 1961 the Gold Coast Australian Football League was established and four days later the first Australian rules football club on the Gold Coast was formed, Southport Australian Football Club. On 7 June it was revealed the team would be known as the Southport Magpies and would based at Owen Park. The team would also wear the black and white stripes similar to the Collingwood Football Club. In early June a second Gold Coast team was established in Palm Beach and was known as the Central Australian Football Club. On 25 June Southport would play their first game against the Central Football Club at Labrador Sports Reserve. The magpies would come out victorious by 11 points. The game attracts so much attention that a second game was scheduled for 9 July and would be played in Palm Beach and the Centrals would win the second game by 25 points. A third game between the two clubs was played on 23 July and Southport were comfortable winners by 39 points.

The season was temporarily interrupted when a Gold Coast representative side was scheduled to play the Royal Australian Navy team in Palm Beach on 16 August. The Gold Coast team, who were captained by Southport player Ken McDonald, beat the Navy side by 5 points. In August Ipswich had entered the Gold Coast Australian Football League and matches between the three clubs occurred. An inter-district game between Southport and the Ipswich Football Club was scheduled on 25 September at Labrador Sports Ground and was considered the first Gold Coast Australian Football League Grand Final. Southport would claim victory by 13 points to win their first premiership.

Senior football on the Gold Coast became stagnant in 1962 as the Southport Magpies struggled to find any local opposition. The Central Football club had rebranded to Coolangatta at the beginning of the season but faltered and become the Currumbin Australian Football Club by the end of the season. Southport was largely instrumental in the creation of the Surfers Paradise Australian Football Club but the club also failed to become resourceful enough to compete. In an attempt to grow the code, Southport scheduled several showcase matches against Brisbane-based QANFL clubs Enoggera, Mayne, Morningside and University. A junior competition was also started in 1962 and in a stark difference to the senior competition the junior and schools competition enjoyed immense success. The junior competition was such a success that the local paper the South Coast Bulletin would often report on junior matches rather than senior matches. With only two senior clubs based on the Gold Coast, the GCAFL Grand Final was contested between Southport and Currumbin with the Magpies claiming their second consecutive premiership by 53 points.

Premiers
Gold Coast AFL (1961-1996) / AFLQ - Gold Coast Division (1997-1999)

 1961: Southport
 1962: Southport
 1963: Surfers Paradise
 1964: Southport
 1965: Palm Beach/Currumbin
 1966: Southport
 1967: Surfers Paradise
 1968: Surfers Paradise
 1969: Surfers Paradise
 1970: Labrador
 1971: Palm Beach/Currumbin
 1972: Surfers Paradise
 1973: Palm Beach/Currumbin
 1974: Surfers Paradise
 1975: Southport
 1976: Southport
 1977: Southport
 1978: Coolangatta
 1979: Southport
 1980: Southport
 1981: Coolangatta
 1982: Coolangatta
 1983: Coolangatta
 1984: Surfers Paradise
 1985: Palm Beach/Currumbin
 1986: Labrador
 1987: Broadbeach
 1988: Coolangatta
 1989: Coolangatta
 1990: Surfers Paradise
 1991: Labrador
 1992: Surfers Paradise
 1993: Labrador
 1994: Labrador
 1995: Palm Beach/Currumbin
 1996: Broadbeach
 1997: Palm Beach/Currumbin
 1998: Surfers Paradise
 1999: Palm Beach Currumbin

Southport accepted into the QAFL
Following a year and a half of applications, Southport would be accepted into the Queensland Australian Football League in 1983. Entry into the league caused a problem with both Southport and the Western Magpies, who shared mascots and guernseys. Southport would rebrand from their Magpies moniker to the Southport Sharks. The Brisbane clubs in the QAFL had long seen the Gold Coast as a lesser competition and weren't expecting Southport to achieve much in the Brisbane-based league. However, the Sharks would send shock waves through the competition when they claimed the QAFL premiership in their debut season with a victory over the Morningside Australian Football Club in the Grand Final. Southport President Dr Alan McKenzie did not miss the opportunity to let the Brisbane clubs know how they felt declaring "For too long Brisbane people have denigrated Gold Coast football. Our win just shows how strong Coast footy is". Meanwhile, in the GCAFL, Coolangatta recorded their third consecutive premiership.

The following season saw Southport struggle to hold on to their premiership players from the previous year and would only retain eleven for the 1984 season. Troubles would transfer to their on field performances as the team lost their first four games of the season. Following a match against Coorparoo in which future VFL player Jason Dunstall starred, the Sharks would win twelve consecutive matches before being eliminated by Morningside in the preliminary final. Once again determined to prove to the Brisbane clubs that Gold Coast football was not a joke, the Sharks would set their eyes on premiership glory again in 1985. Throughout the home and away season the Sharks would only be defeated two times and would reach the Grand Final with a 27-point victory over Mayne in the Major Semifinal. Two weeks later the Sharks would again face Mayne in the Grand Final and with a minute to go, Southport full-forward Glen Middlemiss would kick a goal that would seal a three-point victory. The Sharks would also do the QAFL sweep that season with their reserves and colts teams claiming their respective premierships as well as the senior team winning the midweek Championship.

Southport began the 1986 season with a bang by signing Brownlow Medal winning ruckman Gary Dempsey in an attempt to cover some of the players they had lost. The move would prove successful with the Sharks reaching a second consecutive Grand Final. Despite defeating Coorparoo by 98 points two weeks prior to the Grand Final, the Sharks would fall in the premiership decider by ten points. Unbeknownst to the Sharks, the Gold Coast was about to receive its own VFL football club in 1987.

Bears based at Carrara
In 1986 the Victorian Football League Commission announced plans to introduce privately owned clubs in Brisbane and Perth. The Brisbane license was awarded to a consortium headed by former actor Paul Cronin and bankrolled by entrepreneur Christopher Skase. It was expected that the newly formed Brisbane Football Club would be based at the Gabba, however Skase had other plans for the team. Skase opted for the team to be based out of Carrara Stadium on the Gold Coast and nicknamed the team the 'Bears'. He justified the decision by pointing out that Carrara possessed a ground the same size as the MCG while the Gabba had a greyhound track surrounding the field and wasn't suitable for football.

The Bears struggled to attract the interest of high-profile players to join the team for their inaugural season. Billionaire owner Skase decided to open the chequebook and the Bears were able to acquire the services of 1985 Brownlow Medalist Brad Hardie and Collingwood captain Mark Williams. After winning two of their first three away games of the 1987 season, the followers in Queensland were optimistic about the club's future in the lead up to their first home game. The Bears would play their first home game at Carrara Stadium against the Fitzroy Football Club in front of a sell out crowd of 17,795.

The Fitzroy Lions would win the encounter by fifteen points. In 1989 the Brisbane Bears and the Albert Shire Council signed off on a 30-year lease for the ground with an option for a further 10 years. Later that year on 15 July the Bears hosted the first ever night match at Carrara against the Geelong Cats in front of a then record crowd of 18,198.

Bears move and the impact
Insufficient public transport to and from the stadium, as well as the poor on field performance of the Bears, resulted in low crowds at the Bears games and prompted the local media to refer to it as the Curse of Carrara as well as labeling the team the Carrara Koalas or the Bad News Bears. The new owner of the Bears, Reuben Pelerman, would lose a further $10 million between the 1990–1992 AFL seasons. Despite local fans disagreeing with CEO Andrew Ireland, the ever-increasing problems with Carrara Stadium would lead to the Brisbane Bears permanently moving north to the Gabba for the 1993 AFL season.

Sharks bid to enter the AFL
Although interest in the sport had waned on the Gold Coast during the years the Bears were based at Carrara, the Southport Sharks continued to stamp their authority in the QAFL as a powerhouse club. Eight consecutive Grand Finals between 1986 and 1993 showed the club's consistency with premierships years coming in 1987, 1989, 1990 and 1992.

In 1996 the Southport Sharks began bidding for acceptance into the Australian Football League. At the conclusion of the 1996 AFL season it was announced the Brisbane Bears and Fitzroy Lions would merge, leaving a sixteenth spot in the AFL open. The AFL decided to hand the open license to the Port Adelaide Football Club and in the process rejected Southport's bid. Now on a mission to prove the AFL made the wrong decision by not granting them a license, the Sharks would win four consecutive QAFL premierships between 1997 and 2000. This led to the AFL Chief Executive Wayne Jackson stating "I was left with the indelible impression that if ever there was another side outside of a capital, no one else would be in as strong a position as Southport to compete for that. There was nothing like the vibrancy surrounding the Gold Coast. They were the standout (state league) club anywhere around Australia".

GCAFL absorbed by QAFL
Following the 1996 GCAFL season the league was absorbed by the QAFL state league and created a Gold Coast division for the clubs. In 2000 the Gold Coast division was abolished and teams were assigned to different QAFL divisions according to the strength of each club. Broadbeach and Labrador were admitted into the top division while Burleigh, Coolangatta-Tweed Heads, Palm Beach Currumbin and Surfers Paradise were placed in the second division. Although other Gold Coast clubs had joined the QAFL the Southport Sharks would continue to prove themselves as the Gold Coast's powerhouse club with five consecutive QAFL Grand Final showings between 2004 and 2008, claiming premierships in 2005, 2006 and 2008.

AFL push for Gold Coast team

By 2004 the city of the Gold Coast had become the sixth most populated city in Australia and had begun to attract the attention of sports leagues around the country. The Southport Sharks continued to bid for a place in the AFL and in August 2004 it was revealed the Sharks attempted to lure the Melbourne Football Club to move to the Gold Coast permanently. The bids would be unsuccessful but a surprise crowd of 16,591 at Carrara to a pre-season match between the Brisbane Lions and Essendon prompted the Australian Football League to act. The AFL scheduled one pre-season match as well as two home and away fixtures at Carrara Stadium in 2006, two of which involved the Brisbane Lions.

The three scheduled games in 2006 would be considered a success which would lead to the North Melbourne Football Club signing a three-year deal to play ten home games at Carrara between 2007 and 2009. Following another successful season of Australian rules football at Carrara, the AFL offered a $100 million package to the North Melbourne Football Club to move to the Gold Coast permanently. With relocation looking likely, James Brayshaw began campaigning for the president position with the slogan 'Keep North at North'. On 7 December 2007 the newly appointed Kangaroos chairman James Brayshaw announced the club would not be moving to the Gold Coast permanently and would continue to be based out of Melbourne.

In January 2008, it was reported that the AFL officially registered the name Gold Coast Football Club Ltd with the Australian Securities and Investments Commission (ASIC). The registration was effective from 24 December 2007. The registration was of a public company limited by guarantees rather than by shares, the corporate personality common to 15 of 16 of the current AFL teams, the exception being the Fremantle Football Club. In March 2008, the AFL won the support of the league's 16 club presidents to establish a side on the Gold Coast and an 18th side in Western Sydney. A bid team known as GC17 consisted of Minter Ellison, head of the largest Australian-based international law firm group, John Witheriff, the Gold Coast chairman, Graeme Downie, an ex-Brisbane Lions president, Dr Alan Mackenzie, president of the Southport Sharks, Dale Dickson, the CEO of the Gold Coast city council and Bob Gordon, a Gold Coast Bulletin editor. In May 2008 it was revealed that Michael Voss had expressed interest in coaching the newly created Gold Coast bid team.

In July AFL CEO Andrew Demetriou made a surprise visit to the Gold Coast in an attempt to help the GC17 bid team gain corporate support. In August 2008 the GC17 bid team hired former West Coast Eagles captain Guy McKenna to be the inaugural coach of the team as well as former Brisbane Lions players Shaun Hart and Marcus Ashcroft as assistants. The deadline for the team to reach the AFL requirements occurred in October 2008 and the GC17 bid fulfilled all the criteria.

The last hurdle the GC17 bid team faced would come down to whether the Queensland Labor Party would be re-elected in the 2009 state election. With 42,000 supporters signed up and 110 sponsors already committed, the final roadblock would involve the Queensland Labor Party's $60 million redevelopment of Carrara Stadium that would occur if they won the election. The Queensland Labor Party would win the 2009 election and in doing so secured the AFL license for the GC17 bid team. On March 31, 2009 AFL Chief Executive Andrew Demetriou announced that the Gold Coast bid team had been granted an AFL license to enter the league in 2011 and become the seventeenth team.

Gold Coast Football Club
Following the announcement that the GC17 bid team had been granted an AFL license, it was revealed the new team would be called the Gold Coast Football Club and would play their 2009 season in the TAC Cup. The club shocked many on July 29, 2009 when they signed Queensland Rugby League player Karmichael Hunt from the Brisbane Broncos to a three-year deal. After a season of mixed results the Gold Coast Football Club would finish fifth on the ladder with a record of ten wins, seven losses and one draw. In the team's first finals match they faced the Northern Knights at Visy Park and would come out victorious by fourteen points. They would then be eliminated in the semifinals by the Geelong Falcons.

During the 2009 off season the Gold Coast Football Club would make major inroads by signing Geelong Cats premiership play Nathan Ablett, former North Melbourne player Daniel Harris and former Collingwood duo Danny Stanley and Sam Iles. The team was also allowed to sign up to twelve 17-year-old players from around the country. On July 22, 2010 it was revealed during a Rise Up function at the Southport Sharks that the new Gold Coast AFL team would be known as the Gold Coast Suns. The club's guernsey and song were also revealed on the night. The club's 2010 VFL season would prove to be not as successful as the season before, only recording five wins and finishing tenth on the ladder. Meanwhile, in the QAFL the Labrador Tigers reached the Grand Final, the first Gold Coast team to do outside of Southport. The Tigers would lose the final by 22 points.

On 17 August 2010 it was revealed the Gold Coast Suns had signed their first AFL contracted player in the form of Nathan Bock. Signings of Campbell Brown, Josh Fraser, Jarrod Harbrow and Michael Rischitelli would follow before the biggest signing in the club's short history. On 29 September 2010 the club announced the signing of two time premiership player and 2009 Brownlow medalist Gary Ablett Jr. On 2 April 2011 the Gold Coast Suns made their historic AFL debut against the Carlton Football Club, they were beaten soundly by 119 points. Three weeks later the Suns would record their first AFL win over the Port Adelaide Football Club by three points in Adelaide. The Suns would only taste victory two more times that season to compile a win–loss record of 3-19 en route to collecting the wooden spoon.

In the Suns second AFL season the club would go on a fifteen match losing streak to begin the season with many media outlets putting it down to the second year blues. The losing streak was snapped with a goal after the siren victory against Richmond in Cairns. The team would then finish the season off strongly with two home wins against  and Carlton. They would finish the year with the same record of 3-19, finishing second last on the ladder.

Current Gold Coast Clubs

Former Clubs

Notes

Grounds

Carrara Stadium

In early 1987, Brisbane Bears financial backer Christopher Skase, would fund a redevelopment of Carrara Stadium to feature makeshift stands. In 1989 Skase would orchestrate the installment of $6 million flood lights in order to allow the Bears to host night games. The Bears announced in late 1992 that they would be moving away from Carrara permanently, instead opting for the Gabba in Brisbane.

Australian rules football would not return at a professional level until 2006 when 8,258 fans saw the Melbourne Demons hosted the Adelaide Crows in Round 3 of the 2006 AFL season. Four rounds later Queensland's own Brisbane Lions and the Hawthorn Hawks clashed in front of 12,315 spectators. The two games were deemed a success and in late 2006 the North Melbourne Kangaroos signed a three-year deal with the AFL to play ten home games out of Carrara. Following another successful season of Australian rules football at Carrara, the AFL offered a $100 million package to the North Melbourne Football Club to move to the Gold Coast permanently but North under President James Bradshaw's leadership rejected the offer.

Over these years Carrara Stadium also played host to several QAFL Grand Finals involving the Southport Sharks. On 7 May 2009 a $144.2 million upgrade of Carrara Stadium began to accommodate the new Gold Coast Football Club upon entry into the AFL in 2011. The site would be demolished with only the six flood lights remaining from the previous stadium. The newly upgraded stadium would hold 25,000 seats with the ability to be upgraded to 40,000 seats if needed.

List of VFL/AFL games played at Carrara

Rivalries

QClash
The QClash is the name for a rivalry between the Gold Coast Suns and the Brisbane Lions that began in the 2011 AFL season. On May 7, 2011 the Gold Coast won the first QClash played at the Gabba by eight points. The Lions would even the score in the second QClash, again played at the Gabba. In 2012 Brisbane would get the better of the Gold Coast in both QClashes. The ledger between the two clubs currently stands at 3–1 in favour of Brisbane.

Broadbeach vs Southport
The most intense rivalry in local Queensland football exists between the neighbouring clubs in the form of the Southport Sharks and the Broadbeach Cats and stretches back to their first meeting in 1971. Matches between the two teams generally result in a larger audience and a heated contest on the field. The rivalry reached boiling point in 1999 when the Sharks successfully lured future AFL number 1 draft pick Nick Riewoldt from the Cats. As of the completion of the 2013 NEAFL season the win–loss–draw record between the two clubs stands at 70-10-0 in favour of the Sharks.

Notable AFL players from the Gold Coast

Junior Gold Coast Clubs

See also
 Sport in Queensland
 Sports on the Gold Coast, Queensland

References

Gold Coast
Australian rules football
Australian rules football